Rekem may be:

 Rekem, Belgium, part of the municipality of Lanaken, province of Limburg
 an ancient name for the city of Petra, or of Kadesh or some other Middle Eastern city
 Rekem (Midianite king), killed by Phinehas in the time of Moses